Natalie Corless (born 27 November 2003) is a Canadian luger.

Career
At the age of 16 in December 2019, Natalie Corless, along with Caitlin Nash, became the first women ever to compete in a FIL World Cup doubles race. They finished in 22nd place out of 23 sleds (the last sled crashed out). A month later the pair would go onto compete at the first ever girls' doubles event at the Winter Youth Olympics, winning silver.

For the 2021–22 season, Corless switched focus to the singles event.

In January 2022, Corless was named to Canada's 2022 Olympic team.

References

External links
 
 
 
 

2003 births
Living people
Canadian female lugers
Olympic lugers of Canada
Youth Olympic silver medalists for Canada
Lugers at the 2020 Winter Youth Olympics
Lugers at the 2022 Winter Olympics
Sportspeople from New Westminster
Medalists at the 2020 Winter Youth Olympics
21st-century Canadian women